Dean Beard (August 31, 1935 - April 4, 1989) was an American rockabilly musician, known as the "West Texas Wild Man".

Early life
Beard was born in Santa Anna, Texas. He was the son of Raymond and Opral (Baker) Beard. He lived in Coleman most of his life. In high school, he and his friends formed a band called the Crew Cats.

Career 
He played at a night club in Memphis with Elvis Presley in the mid-1950s. Beard's first record "Red Rover"/ "Wake Up Jacob" was released in 1955 for Fox Records. That same year, he made another single, "Time Is Hangin' Heavy On My Hands" /" Sing, Sing, Sing". Both singles didn’t attract any attention.

Sun Records
Between 1956 and 1957, he recorded for Sun Records, but none of his songs were released until years later. Some of these songs feature a young Jim Seals on saxophone, who would later co-found the duo, Seals and Crofts, with drummer Dash Crofts.

Rakin' and Scrapin' 
In 1957, his most popular hit, “Rakin’ and Scrapin’”, was released on Edmoral Records in March, but didn’t become popular, until another version he made was released a month later for Atlantic Records. He recorded it with Seals on saxophone and Crofts on drums. He kept making records for Atlantic such as, "Party Party". Earlier that year, he teamed up with songwriter Slim Willet, and wrote their most successful songs together.

Challenge Records 
He recorded for Challenge Records in 1958, and was also a pianist with The Champs, who also had a contract with that label.

In 1959, he was fired from the Champs by manager/rhythm guitarist Dave Burgess because he was accused of taking part of the cut meant for Seals and Crofts, but made one more record for Challenge that year.

Later career 
He kept recording for different labels through the 1960s with less success.

His last single was in 1966 for Sims Records called, “Are There Honkey Tonks In Heaven" / "Pocketfull Of Stardust". He achieved recognition in the 1970s and 80s when he started performing live again.

Death
He died in Coleman, Texas Hospital on April 4, 1989 from diabetes and other health related issues.

Discography

References

American rockabilly musicians
Country musicians from Texas